Nikolaos Angelidis (born 22 January 1977) is a Greek cyclist. He competed in the men's sprint at the 2000 Summer Olympics.

References

External links
 

1977 births
Living people
Greek male cyclists
Olympic cyclists of Greece
Cyclists at the 2000 Summer Olympics
Sportspeople from Athens